The Carl-Zeiss-Gymnasium Jena is a state-funded German elite gymnasium school (grammar school) teaching highly gifted students in the fields of math, science, and technology. Before changing its profile to fully focus on these aspects, it was a regular German public gymnasium with a special separate school attached to it. The school is named for  optician Carl Zeiss and is located in the city of Jena in Germany's federal state of Thuringia. The school accepts students from all over the federal state.

Pupils 

, there were about 500 students attending this school, but not all of them were enrolled in the special education program, which is restricted to highly gifted students. Entrance to the school is contingent on certain requirements, including qualification exams, grades, awards, and previous academic accomplishments.

In order to enter the special education program, students in ninth grade must take an examination, the results of which determine who will be accepted into the special section. Later on, it was made possible that children could enter the special section from fifth grade. Students entering the special education program in fifth grade must also take an examination in ninth grade.

The gymnasium also has a boarding school, established in 2000, which is separate and privately maintained. It offers a possibility for students in ninth to twelfth grade to live close to the school. Fees for this boarding school are subsidized by the federal state, but spaces are limited.

History

Formation 

This process first yielded a normal gymnasium,, and also a special section. This particular part of the school has been available to students from ninth grade onwards.

Support 

The  has been supported by the Carl Zeiss Foundation, the sole shareholder of  Carl Zeiss AG and Schott AG, all of which were founded in Jena. During the time of the German Democratic Republic, many students were recruited by the company and became engineers or managers after their graduation.  Even today, there is connection between the school and the company.

Facilities 

The school receives good funding from the federal state and is well equipped compared to other gymnasiums in the region. The technical sections of the school meet high standards.

The special school section used to be in a separate building from the regular one. After the main building was renovated from 2003 to 2005, the special school moved in the main building. The old building is now used by an elementary school.

Transition 

After a trial period ending in 2008, the school was supposed to be completely transformed into a mere  (special school), after which the program would be available to students in fifth grade and older.

This office had been held for a long time by Rüdiger Eisenbrand, who quit his official school service. He became the mayor of the city of Apolda.

Curriculum

Syllabus 

The curriculum focuses in depth on mathematics and natural science, with an abundance of classes related to those topics. Classes are kept very small, often 14–20 students maximum.

Since the curriculum of the Carl-Zeiss-Gymnasium is highly mathematically and scientifically oriented, it offers advanced educational sessions for students. Starting in ninth grade, every student gets to choose one subject of study to deepen their knowledge in the fields of math, physics, biology, chemistry, or computer science. Two extra lessons a week are dedicated to the student's chosen field. Unlike normal subjects, tutors of this  (selective compulsory curriculum) do not grade students for those extra sessions.

As the second major field of study, they can choose informatics, chemistry, biology, or physics.

Projects 

Ninth-grade students have to write their first project paper on a scientific topic of their choice. It is unusual to assign a large project of this type to students in such an early grade.

At the end, they have to give a presentation.

The  (seminar paper) – a major project during 11th grade – has to be written about a mathematical or scientific topic.

Graduation 

Reputation 

On some occasions, the school has hosted some of those competitions mentioned above.

References

External links 
 Homepage of the Carl-Zeiss-Gymnasium Jena
 Homepage of the boarding school
 An article in the newspaper "Berliner Morgenpost" about the school 

Gymnasiums in Germany
Specialist schools in Germany
Schools in Thuringia
Education in Jena
Buildings and structures in Jena
Educational institutions established in 1963
1963 establishments in Germany